Greatest Hits is the first compilation album by DJ Jazzy Jeff & the Fresh Prince. The album includes several of the duo's biggest hits, including "Girls Ain't Nothing but Trouble", "Parents Just Don't Understand", and "Summertime". This also includes the previously unreleased track "Lovely Daze", and two solo tracks by Will Smith from his major-motion picture film, Men in Black.

Track listing

International edition
 "Boom! Shake the Room" (Album Version) – 3:48
 "Summertime" (Album Version) – 4:31
 "Men in Black" (Album Version) – 3:45
 "Girls Ain't Nothing But Trouble" (1988 Extended Remix) – 4:48
 "Twinkle, Twinkle (I'm Not a Star)" (UK Flavour Radio Edit) – 4:10
 "The Things That U Do" (Hula Radio Remix) – 4:09
 "I Think I Can Beat Mike Tyson" (Album Version) – 4:48
 "Just Cruisin'" (Album Version) – 3:59
 "Ring My Bell" (Mr. Lee's Radio Mix) – 4:04
 "I Wanna Rock" (Radio Edit) – 4:18
 "Parents Just Don't Understand" (Single Edit) – 5:13
 "I'm Looking for the One (To Be with Me)" (Video Version) – 3:40
 "A Nightmare on My Street" (Single Version) – 4:53
 "Can't Wait to Be with You" (Brixton Flavour Radio Mix) – 3:51
 "Brand New Funk" (Album Version) – 4:04
 "The Fresh Prince of Bel-Air (Theme)" – 2:56
Bonus tracks (previously unreleased)
 "Lovely Daze" (Candyhill Mix) – 4:13
 "Megamix" (Clean Radio Edit) – 3:42

American edition
 "Girls Ain't Nothing But Trouble" (1988 Extended Remix) – 4:48
 "Men in Black" – 3:45
 "Summertime" – 4:31
 "Parents Just Don't Understand" (Single Edit) – 5:13
 "Boom! Shake the Room" – 3:48
 "Just Cruisin'" – 3:59
 "Ring My Bell" (Mr. Lee's Radio Mix) – 4:04
 "Brand New Funk" – 4:04
 "Lovely Daze" – 4:13
 "The Fresh Prince of Bel-Air" (Theme) – 2:56
 "A Nightmare on My Street" (Single Version) – 4:53
 "A Touch of Jazz" – 3:17
 "I Think I Can Beat Mike Tyson" – 4:48
 "The Magnificent Jazzy Jeff" – 5:22
 "I'm Looking for the One (To Be with Me)" – 3:40
 "You Saw My Blinker" – 4:12
 "Summertime '98" (Soulpower Remix) – 4:31
 "Megamix" (Clean Radio Edit) – 3:42

Charts

Certifications

References

DJ Jazzy Jeff & The Fresh Prince compilation albums
Albums produced by Teddy Riley
1998 greatest hits albums
Hip hop compilation albums
Jive Records compilation albums